"Soldiering On" is a dramatic monologue written by Alan Bennett in 1987 for television, as part of his Talking Heads series for the BBC. The series became very popular, moving onto BBC Radio, international theatre, becoming one of the best-selling audio book releases of all time and included as part of both the A-level and GCSE English syllabus. It was the fourth episode of the first series of Talking Heads, starring Stephanie Cole.  "Soldiering On" was remade in 2020 starring Harriet Walter.

Storyline 

Muriel Carpenter (Stephanie Cole in 1988, Harriet Walter in 2020) is a strong woman, and always has been – a pillar of the community, a regular charity worker, and a volunteer for Meals on Wheels; and looking after her mentally ill daughter, Margaret, has fortified her resolve – so, after the death of her husband, Muriel is well prepared to cope with the crisis. She adopts a brisk, cheerful approach: socialising with guests at the wake, giving her husband's belongings to various charitable causes, and deciding she must devise an efficient plan to deal with her grief. Muriel's husband left her a considerable sum of money, and, despite having been advised not to make any "big decisions", she soon agrees to hand over control of the money to their son Giles (who received nothing from the will). Although it is clear to the audience that Giles is mismanaging the money, it comes as a surprise to Muriel when he loses her inheritance through poor investments. He reassures her there is nothing to worry about and the problem is simply "liquidity", but she is soon forced to sell her home and possessions and move to a small seaside town.

Muriel ends the story poor and alone, losing contact with her children, Margaret having shown a great improvement and living an almost normal life after a spell of psychiatric treatment. It is implied Margaret's mental illness was the result of sexual molestation by her father. Muriel appears to be aware of this and also begins to wonder if she contributed to her husband's end with "all those death-dealing breakfasts." She is now reduced to using the Meals on Wheels service she had once commanded, and her only entertainments are television and cassette tapes from the library. Still, she instructs the audience not to think of her story as a tragic one - "I'm not a tragic woman: Not the type!"

Reception

See also 
 English A-level and GCSEs

References

External links
Episode details

BBC television dramas
British plays
BBC Radio 7 (rebranded) programmes